Universal Document Converter is a virtual printer and PDF creator for Microsoft Windows developed by fCoder Group. It can create PDF documents (as raster images or searchable text) and files in graphic formats JPEG, TIFF, PNG, GIF, PCX, DCX and BMP.  It can create graphic or PDF files from any document that can be printed. There are full and demo versions.

System requirements
 Microsoft Windows 2000/XP/Vista/7/8/8.1/10 or Microsoft Windows Server 2003/2008/2012
 Supports 32-bit and 64-bit systems 
 Universal Document Converter does not require GhostScript to generate the PDF files.

Features
Universal Document Converter is able to create large size files (print with resolution up to 6000 DPI and PDF files up to 10 Gb since 2009) and can be used in professional projects.

 In 2006 Universal Document Converter 4.1 was tested for DELOS Digital Preseravtion Testbed project (Vienna University of Technology study on Long-Term Preservation of Electronic Theses and Dissertations) along with Adobe Acrobat 7 Professional
 В 2009 Harvard Planning & Project Management of Harvard University had included Universal Document Converter as one of the programs recommended for DWG to TIFF conversion

Universal Document Converter can also be used to create e-books.

SDK
A public API is distributed with Universal Document Converter. It allows to integrate the software functions into third-party applications.

References

External links

Compress PDF Document Online
JPG to PDF Converter Online
Review by Softopedia.com, October 8, 2014
Review by CNET.com, December 7, 2014
Review by tucows.com, September 24, 2008
iPod Fully Loaded: If You've Got It, You Can iPod It, 2006. Andy Ihnatko, 

Windows-only software
Computer printers
PDF software
2000 software